NK Dugo Selo is a Croatian association football club founded in 1923 and based in Dugo Selo, a small town near Zagreb. They compete in the Croatian Third Division.

Current squad

External links
NK Dugo Selo at Nogometni magazin 

Association football clubs established in 1923
Football clubs in Croatia
Football clubs in Zagreb County
1923 establishments in Croatia